Leidolf was a manufacturer of optical equipment situated in Wetzlar, Germany.  It was founded by Rudolf Leidolf in 1921, initially producing lenses for microscopes. In 1948 camera production was started and in 1962 the factory ceased operations. Leidolf is in no way related to Leitz (the manufacturer of Leica), even though Wetzlar has been the historical location for both companies.

Camera models 
 Leidax, Leidox (1949)
 Lordomat (C35/SE/SLE) (1953)
 Lordox Junior (1954)
 Lordette (1955)
 Lordomatic (1955)
 Lordomatic IIR (1955)
 Lordox Vollautomat (1960)
 Lordox Super Automat (1960)
 Unimatic (1961)

Citations

External links 
Camerapedia on Leidolf
"Lordox Luxus": Vintage ad from 1958, BRD
Leidolf from UK camera
Cameras
Photography companies of Germany
Wetzlar
Lens manufacturers
German brands
135 film cameras